Andrea Müller (born 21 August 1965) is a German former professional tennis player.

Müller, who was born in Donaueschingen, reached a best singles ranking of 183 in the world. After making her WTA Tour main draw debut at the Oslo Open in 1991, Müller qualified for the 1992 Virginia Slims of Florida, where she was beaten in the first round by Alexia Dechaume. In 1993 she featured in the qualifying draws of the Australian Open, French Open and Wimbledon.

ITF finals

Singles: 3 (0–3)

References

External links
 
 

1965 births
Living people
West German female tennis players
German female tennis players
People from Donaueschingen
Sportspeople from Freiburg (region)
Tennis people from Baden-Württemberg